Hairy Apes BMX is an Austin, Texas, USA-based band playing an eclectic mix of rock, jazz,  Latin, afro-funk, hip-hop, and punk. They won the Austin Regional Poll at The 1st Annual Independent Music Awards. According to Dillon, the band's name refers to humans all being "just a bunch of hairy apes" and BMX stands for "butt-moving experience".

Current members
 Mike Dillon - vibraphone, percussion, vocals
 John Speice - drums, percussion
 J.J. Richards - bass, vocals
 E. Clarke Wyatt - keyboards

Past members
 Dave Abbruzzese (formerly of Pearl Jam) - drums, keyboards, production
 Zac Baird - keyboards, vocals

Discography 
 Expatriape 1999
 Out Demons  2000
 Beautiful Seizure 2003

References
Planet of the Apes, J.J. Hensley, The Pitch, August 3, 2000
Bio at JamBase

External links
 Hair Apes BMX MySpace

Rock music groups from Texas
Independent Music Awards winners
Musical groups from Austin, Texas
Musical groups established in 1999
1999 establishments in Texas